Ellis Nathan Remy (born 13 February 1984) is a semi-professional footballer who last played as a striker for Ware. He played in the Football League for Lincoln City and international football for Montserrat.

Career

Club career
Remy started his career at Wimbledon, before signing for non-League club Hastings United in the summer of 2002. After a successful trial, he signed for Football League club, Lincoln City at the start of the 2003–04 season. He made his debut for Lincoln on 9 August 2003, in the 1–0 Division Three home defeat to Oxford United, coming on as a substitute for Simon Weaver in the 64th minute. Three days later, Remy made his last appearance for Lincoln City, in another 1–0 home loss, to Stockport County in the Football League Cup First Round, coming on as a substitute for Rory May in the 84th minute. He was loaned out to non-League football club Kettering Town in September where he made two appearances, scoring once. In October, Remy dropped back into non-League football permanently signing for Isthmian League Premier Division club Grays Athletic for a fee of £5,000, a club record at the time.

In August 2004, Remy joined Redbridge on loan, before eventually signing for the club on a permanent basis in October following his release alongside Daniel Lunan and Chris Wild. He was released late in October due to budget constraints, subsequently moving on to Braintree Town in November, before a short spell at East Thurrock United, and then onto Margate in summer 2005. On leaving East Thurrock, joint manager, Lee Patterson commented saying; "With Tony [Boot] coming it means that Ellis Remy has joined Margate. Ellis is a really nice lad, but wasn't really suited to play up front with Steve West." After leaving Margate, Remy went on to play for Bromley, signing a short-term deal in January 2006, whilst training with Conference National club Dagenham & Redbridge. He went on to join Staines Town in March.

He then signed for Harrow Borough in August 2006, although returned to East Thurrock United and then joined Folkestone Invicta in December. In December 2007, Neil Smith signed Remy for Conference South club Welling United from Folkestone. He went on to play for Heybridge Swifts signing in the summer of 2008, however, he left in September alongside Darren Blewitt after manager Brian Statham resigned. Remy subsequently joined Isthmian League Division One North club Enfield Town alongside former Heybridge teammate Darren Blewitt and Mark Nougher in September 2008.

Potters Bar Town signed Remy on loan from Bishop's Stortford, scoring on his debut against former club Enfield Town. During his loan spell at Potters Bar, he made 13 appearances in the league scoring eight goals. In August 2010, Remy signed for Isthmian League Division One North club Brentwood Town after his release from Bishop's Stortford. Remy signed for Maldon & Tiptree in February 2011 to bolster their attacking options, joint-manager Brad King commented on Remy saying that he "has a good record and a wealth of experience of non-league football". He then joined former Brentwood manager, Carl Griffiths at Aveley of the Isthmian League Premier Division at the start of the 2011–12 season. Remy went on to sign for Southern League Premier Division club Hemel Hempstead Town in January 2012. Remy signed for Conference South club Eastbourne Borough on 24 February 2012. He left Eastbourne at the end of the season. However, he rejoined Eastbourne shortly after the start of the 2012–13 season.

After being released by Eastbourne, Remy signed for Southern League Premier club Hitchin Town on 15 March 2013.

International career
Remy first trained with the Montserrat national team in 2007. Montserrat coach, Kenny Dyer said that Remy had tried to get his younger cousins who were playing for Arsenal and West Ham United as under-17s "on board for the future". He eventually made his international debut for Montserrat on 7 October 2010, in the 7–0 away defeat to Saint Vincent and the Grenadines at Victoria Park, Kingstown in the Caribbean Cup Group B. However, after receiving two yellow cards, he was sent-off in the 68th minute, and failed to make another appearance in the tournament.

He played all three games for Montserrat in the 2012 edition and scored twice in the final game, a 7–0 thrashing of the British Virgin Islands for Montserrat's first win as a FIFA member.

References

External links

Living people
1984 births
English footballers
Montserratian footballers
Montserrat international footballers
Association football forwards
Sportspeople from Hastings
Wimbledon F.C. players
Hastings United F.C. players
Lincoln City F.C. players
Kettering Town F.C. players
Grays Athletic F.C. players
Redbridge F.C. players
Braintree Town F.C. players
East Thurrock United F.C. players
Margate F.C. players
Bromley F.C. players
Staines Town F.C. players
Harrow Borough F.C. players
Folkestone Invicta F.C. players
Welling United F.C. players
Heybridge Swifts F.C. players
Enfield Town F.C. players
Bishop's Stortford F.C. players
Potters Bar Town F.C. players
Brentwood Town F.C. players
Maldon & Tiptree F.C. players
Aveley F.C. players
Hemel Hempstead Town F.C. players
Eastbourne Borough F.C. players
Hitchin Town F.C. players
Haringey Borough F.C. players
Histon F.C. players
Tilbury F.C. players
Enfield Borough F.C. players
Ware F.C. players
English Football League players
Isthmian League players
Southern Football League players
Montserratian expatriate footballers
British people of Montserratian descent
Black British sportspeople